Whickham is a village in Tyne and Wear, North East England. It is in the Metropolitan Borough of Gateshead. It was formerly governed under the historic county of County of Durham.

History
Whickham underwent some expansion in the 1950s when the Lakes Estate was built just off Whickham Highway. Then later in the decade the Oakfield Estate just off Whaggs Lane was built. Grange Estate began the long-term development by JT Bell, (Bellway), the builder, who went on into Clavering Park, Clavering Grange, the Cedars and then Fellside Park.

South-west of Whickham, above the River Derwent, are the ruins of Old Hollinside, a fortified manor house once owned by the Bowes-Lyon family.

The village is located geographically between Gateshead, Consett, Durham, Sunderland and Newcastle-upon-Tyne.

Schools
Whickham has six primary schools, and one secondary school. The Gibside School for special educational needs and disabilities moved to a new location away from Whickham in Spring 2021.

Primary schools:
 Clover Hill Primary School
 Fellside Primary School 
 Front Street Primary School 
 St Mary's R C Primary School
 Washingwell Primary School
 Whickham Parochial C of E Primary School
Secondary schools:
 Whickham School and Sports College

See also
Washing Wells Roman Fort

References

Whickham Football Club
Whickham U21s and Junior Teams

External links

Villages in Tyne and Wear
Unparished areas in Tyne and Wear
Former civil parishes in Tyne and Wear
Gateshead